Talavar-e Yek (also Romanized as Talāvar-e Yek; also known as Talāvar) is a village in Seydun-e Shomali Rural District, Seydun District, Bagh-e Malek County, Khuzestan Province, Iran. At the 2006 census, its population was 995, in 176 families.

References 

Populated places in Bagh-e Malek County